Thomas Seele (c. 1611-1675) was an Irish Anglican, dean of St Patrick's Cathedral, and Provost of Trinity College Dublin from 1661 to 1675.

References

Year of birth uncertain
1610s deaths
17th-century Irish Anglican priests
Deans of St. Patrick's Cathedral, Dublin
Provosts of Trinity College Dublin